Priscilla Zawedde (born 2 February 1996) better known by her stage name Azawi is a Ugandan singer, songwriter and dancer signed by Swangz Avenue in 2019. Her musical genre is  Afrobeats in both Luganda and English. She became the first female Ugandan act to appear on the  New York "Times Square" and Los Angeles billboards.

Early life and education 
Priscilla Zawedde was born 2 February 1996 in Kampala to the late Walusimbi Samuel and Nakamatte Mary. She went to Buganda road primary for her early education and later went to Mother Kevin Primary school in Mukono district, where she completed her primary seven from. She went to St Henry’s college in Ggangu Masajja, Lubiri secondary school, London college in Nansana, St Janani Luwum secondary school for A-level and later on proceeded to Makerere University where she earned a Bachelor of Commerce degree.

Career

Early career 
Azawi’s career began in 2005 as a dancer in a group called Kika dance troupe. As a group, they performed on many stages. Four years later, she joined another dance group known as Crane Performers and all this was done while still in school. After realizing that she was failing in school, she stopped dancing. She nevertheless traveled twice to China to perform with her troupe.

Music career 
In 2011, she started writing songs, first as a hobby, before realizing she could make money from it. Her father died in 2012 and she had to help her mother to cater to her and her two siblings hence concentrating on making money from songwriting.

At her young age, Azawi began writing songs and her songwriting skills got her a meeting with Eddy Kenzo who eventually connected her to other artistes. She has written for artistes like Nina Rose, Lydia Jazmine, Carol Nantongo, Vinka, and Eddy Kenzo.

Azawi later on joined a band in 2015 while doubling as a waiter at a restaurant her mother had just started.

After she had quit her job as a waiter that she wrote "Quinamino," with an intention of selling it but when she walked into Swangz Avenue for the first time in August 2019, she got an offer to become part of the label instead.

Her breakthrough came in January 2020 after releasing her first single titled Quinamino.

In November the same year, Swangz Avenue management signed and unveiled her and she released her first single under the label in January 2020. She's still under the same record label and now has over 20 songs.

Discography

Music albums 

 Lo Fit (2020)
 African Music (2021)

Singles 
 Fwa Fwa Fwa
 Party mood
 Gimme
 Craving you heavy
 Bamututte
 Thankful ft Benon
 Majje ft Fik Fameica, 
 Slow dancing
 Face Me ft A Pass
 Fwa Fwa Fwa
 Ku Kido, 
 My Year
 Tubatiisa
 Party Mood
 Nkuchekele ft Eddy Kenzo, 
 Love you is easy, 
 African Music
 Ache for you.
 Quinamino
 Repeat it
 Lo Fit
 Crazy lover
 Toast to 75
 Mbinyumirwa
 Envision
 Craving You Heavy Remix ft. Chike

Awards and recognition 

 Female Artist of the Year Janzi awards 2021
 Outstanding Album of the Year – African Music Janzi awards 2021
 Outstanding Afro Beat/Pop Artist Janzi awards 2021
 Artist of the Year Buzz Teeniez awards 2021
 Teenz Female Artist of the Year Buzz Teeniez awards 2021
 Teenz Hottest Songwriter Buzz Teeniez awards 2021
 Teenz Hottest Song of the year – ‘Slow Dancing’ Buzz Teeniez awards 2021
 Teenz Flyest video – ‘Slow Dancing’  Buzz Teeniez awards 2021
 Female Artist of the year Zzina Awards 2021/22 
 Best Song Writer of the year Zzina Awards 2021/22
 Best Inspirational Song – Majje ft Fik Fameica Zzina Awards 2021/22

Other activities and achievements 
Azawi is now a Guinness brand ambassador, a role that is also played by Nigerian Afropop Singer Fireboy DML. This was also evidenced in her new video of MAJJE where she featured Ugandan Artiste Fik Fameica and at her recent maiden sold out concert at Lugogo, Kampala that happened in July, 2022.

Azawi in 2021 featured at both New York and Los Angeles "Times Square", making her the first female and third Ugandan act to appear on the billboard after Eddy Kenzo and Bobi Wine.

References 

21st-century Ugandan women singers
Living people
1996 births
Makerere University alumni
Ugandan songwriters
People from Central Region, Uganda
People from Mukono District